Granot Loma is an estate located on County Road 550 north of Marquette, Michigan, constructed in the tradition of the Great Camps of the Adirondacks in the late 19th and early 20th centuries. It was listed on the National Register of Historic Places in 1991.  It is said to be the "biggest log cabin in the world" and the most expensive residence in Michigan.

In 2022, Granot Loma was being touted as a potential space port in the Upper Peninsula.  This would be in tandem with Oscoda, Michigan's Wurtsmith Air Force Base.

History

American businessman Louis Graveraet Kaufman began building Granot Loma in 1919, for use as a summer residence. He hired Marshall and Fox of Chicago as architects and employed three hundred local craftsmen, and was believed to have hired local expert log builder Nestor Kallioinen to oversee the construction. He imported pine logs from Oregon for the construction. Construction was complete in 1923 or 1924, with some additional interior work continuing through 1927 or 1928.

The Loma Farms complex, designed to provide income and supply food for the lodge, was constructed in 1927 by the Bartlett Construction Company of Eau Claire, Wisconsin. Bartlett used a number of designs provided by the Louden Machinery Company of Fairfield, Iowa.

Kaufman held an opening bash in 1927 to celebrate the completion of Granot Loma. Guests who stayed at Granot Loma over the years included tennis star Bill Tilden, George Gershwin, Mary Pickford, Fred Astaire, and Cole Porter.

Louis Kaufman died in 1942; his wife Marie died in 1947. With Marie's passing, the farming operation ceased. One of the couple's daughters, Joan, lived there with her last husband, Jack Martin, the former caretaker of Granot Loma for a few years, but by 1950 the lodge was essentially abandoned. They occupied the farm and the lodge was used for special occasions. Granot Loma was finally sold by the Kaufman family to Tom Baldwin in 1987. Baldwin renovated the house, and in 1991 it was listed on the National Register of Historic Places.

Description
The estate's title, Granot Loma, is a random hodgepodge of letters from the names of Kaufman's first three children and his wife's name. Kaufman retained 22 architects to design the building. Pine logs were shipped from Oregon by train.

As completed in 1923, the  lodge cost US$5 million (equivalent to $70 million in 2016).

The lodge is an enormous, L-shaped structure built of logs over a steel frame and with a slate roof. The estate contains unique and irreplaceable accoutrements, such as Indian/Western scenes by Orry Kelly, an Academy Award-winning designer.

Loma Farms is a planned farming complex which includes thirteen buildings constructed of vitrified clay tile, situated about one-half mile (800 m) from the lodge complex.

See also
Sam Cohodas Lodge

References

Bibliography

External links
Granot Loma official site

Buildings and structures in Marquette, Michigan
National Register of Historic Places in Marquette County, Michigan
Houses completed in 1927